G-loading may refer to:

The act of applying g-force to an object in physics.
General intelligence factor